The Perfect Mile: Three Athletes, One Goal, and Less Than Four Minutes to Achieve It (2004) by Neal Bascomb is a non-fiction book about three runners and their attempts to become the first man to run a mile under four minutes and their first subsequent head-to-head competition. The runners are Englishman Roger Bannister, American Wes Santee, and Australian John Landy.  

June 21, 1954: Less than six weeks after Bannister’s historic feat, Australian John Landy runs 3:58 at a track meet in Finland, throwing down the gauntlet.

August 7, 1954: The Empire Games in Vancouver, Canada, pits the two titans against one another in an event billed the “Miracle Mile.” 

The Perfect Mile (also called the Miracle Mile) is not against the clock, rather it is what was required in heated competition between John Landy and Roger Bannister.

Reception
The New York Times' review calls it an "enthralling book" and says Bascomb "expertly winds up the tension of the three men's many failed attempts to get closer to the magic mark, before Bannister wrote himself into legend first on a windy day at the Oxford University track".

References

External links
 Audio Interview with author and text excerpt on NPR

2004 non-fiction books
Running books
Mariner Books books